The Messerschmitt Me 329 was a design project for a heavy fighter and ground-attack aircraft, developed towards the end of World War II. It was a competitor and possible successor to the Me 410. Like the Me 265, the Me 329 used an advanced flying wing design. Other advanced features included the pilot and navigator sitting side by side in a broad bubble canopy, and a remote-controlled rear gun in the tail. In spite of the futuristic design, the improvement in performance over the Me 410 was marginal. Development received a low priority, and while a full-scale glider was tested at Rechlin in the winter of 1944/5, work on the project was cancelled shortly after.

Specifications (estimated)

See also

References

Further reading

External links

Me 329
Abandoned military aircraft projects of Germany
Twin-engined pusher aircraft
Tailless aircraft
Mid-wing aircraft